ISEC may refer to: 
    
Institute for Social and Economic Change in India
Instituto Superior de Educação e Ciências in Portugal
Instituto Superior de Engenharia de Coimbra in Portugal
International Society for Ecology and Culture, a.k.a. Local Futures
International Space Elevator Consortium
International Structural Engineering and Construction Society
Interdisciplinary Science and Engineering Complex, at Northeastern University

See also
CT510, a video game console previously known as the iSec (Sports Entertainment Center)